Danielle Lucy Gregory (born 4 December 1998) is an English cricketer who currently plays for Surrey, South East Stars and Oval Invincibles. She plays as a right-arm leg break bowler.

Early life
Gregory was born on 4 December 1998, in Frimley, Surrey.

Domestic career
Gregory made her county debut in 2018, for Surrey against Worcestershire. She was Surrey's leading wicket-taker in her first Twenty20 Cup season, taking 7 wickets, with a best bowling of 4/7 against Kent. She was again Surrey's leading wicket-taker in the 2019 Women's Twenty20 Cup, taking 9 wickets at an average of 13.55. Gregory was also part of the Surrey side that won their first London Cup in 2020, putting in a "superb" spell of bowling to take 1/21. She took four wickets for the side in the 2021 Women's Twenty20 Cup. She took five wickets in the 2022 Women's Twenty20 Cup, at an average of 23.20.

In 2020, Gregory played for South East Stars in the Rachael Heyhoe Flint Trophy. She appeared in 2 matches, taking 5 wickets at an average of 14.80. Her best bowling came in her second match, when she took 3/44 against Southern Vipers. She was ever-present for the side in 2021, and helped the side to win the inaugural Charlotte Edwards Cup. She took 6 wickets at an average of 35.66 in the Rachael Heyhoe Flint Trophy and 6 wickets at an average of 26.33 in the Charlotte Edwards Cup. She also played six matches for Oval Invincibles in The Hundred, who went on to win the competition. At the end of the 2021 season, it was announced that Gregory had signed a professional contract with South East Stars. She played 13 matches for South East Stars in 2022, across the Charlotte Edwards Cup and the Rachael Heyhoe Flint Trophy, taking seven wickets. She was also again part of the Oval Invincibles squad for The Hundred, but did not play a match.

References

External links

1998 births
Living people
Cricketers from Frimley
Surrey women cricketers
South East Stars cricketers
Oval Invincibles cricketers